Cariboo was a federal electoral district in British Columbia, Canada, that was represented in the House of Commons of Canada from 1871 to 1892.

This riding was first created as Cariboo District following British Columbia's admission into the Canadian Confederation in 1871. The name was changed to "Cariboo" in 1872, and existed in this form until it was abolished in 1892 when it was amalgamated into the new riding of Yale—Cariboo.  In 1914, Yale—Cariboo was redistributed and Yale and Cariboo were separate ridings once again, though with smaller areas than before.  The Cariboo riding lasted until 1966.  The succession of ridings for the Cariboo area since then has been:

Kamloops—Cariboo (1966—1976)
Cariboo—Chilcotin (1976—2003)
Cariboo—Prince George (2003 - )
Kamloops—Thompson—Cariboo (2004 - )

The Chilcotin region of the riding, west of the Fraser River, was from 1966 to 1976 part of the Coast Chilcotin riding.

The original form of the riding was the whole of the Cariboo Plateau and both Cariboo and Lillooet Land Districts.  Its southern boundary was on the northern edge of the New Westminster riding, and later the Burrard riding, then the North Vancouver riding, with near-coastal localities such as Pemberton, Squamish, Britannia Beach and Port Douglas all politically part of "Cariboo".

Under the Representation Act of 1892, the constituencies of Yale and Cariboo were united to form Yale—Cariboo. In 1914 that riding was broken up and the Yale and Cariboo riding-names were restored, although the new constituencies were considerably smaller than before. The restored Yale riding included the Boundary Country around Grand Forks and Greenwood, but the Kootenay was now a separate riding and the town of Yale itself was not in the restored Yale riding, but in the new riding of Westminster District. The first election using the new boundaries was in 1917. "Government" and "Opposition" were used during the wartime campaign to designate the governing Conservatives vs the Opposition Liberals.

A major redistribution in 1947 took away the southern half of the Cariboo district, with a southern boundary at 52 degrees 30 minutes north, just excluding Williams Lake and the south bank of Quesnel Lake. The rest of the riding extended to the Little Rancheria River and the border with Yukonand the Northwest Territories, therefore including the Omineca, Prince George and Peace River districts.

The Cariboo electoral district was abolished in 1966. Successor ridings were:

Coast Chilcotin (1966 - 1976)
Kamloops—Cariboo (1966 - 1976)
Prince George—Peace River (1966 - 1976)
Skeena (1914 - 2003)

Members of Parliament

Election results

Cariboo, 1917–1968

Cariboo, 1872–1896

See also 
 List of Canadian federal electoral districts
 Past Canadian electoral districts

External links 
Riding history from the Library of Parliament:
1872 - 1892
1914 - 1966

Former federal electoral districts of British Columbia